There have been two baronetcies created for persons with the surname Waller, one in the Baronetage of Ireland and one in the Baronetage of the United Kingdom. One creation is extant as of 2019.

The Waller Baronetcy, of Newport in the County of Tipperary, was created in the Baronetage of Ireland on 1 June 1780 for Robert Waller, Member of the Irish Parliament for Dundalk and a Commissioner of Revenue. The second Baronet served as High Sheriff of King's County in 1826. As of 1 August 2018 the present Baronet was entered into the Official Roll of the Baronetage, with effect from 12 December 2000. He lives in USA.

The Waller Baronetcy, of Braywick Lodge in the County of Berkshire, was created in the Baronetage of the United Kingdom on 30 May 1815 for Wathen Waller, Groom of the Bedchamber to William IV. Born Wathen Phipps, he was the son of Joshua Phipps and his wife Anne, daughter of Thomas Waller, and assumed by sign-manual in 1814 the surname of Waller in lieu of his patronymic as the heir of his maternal great-uncle James Waller. The third baronet was a major general. The seventh baronet was an author and poet and a fellow of the Royal Society of Literature. The title became extinct on his death in 1995.

Waller baronets, of Newport (1780)

Sir Robert Waller, 1st Baronet (1738–1780)
Sir Robert Waller, 2nd Baronet (1768–1826)
Sir Charles Townshend Waller, 3rd Baronet (1772–1830)
Sir Edmund Waller, 4th Baronet (1797–1851), (note: Edmund Waller (disambiguation));
Sir Edmund Arthur Waller, 5th Baronet (1846–1888)
Sir Charles Waller, 6th Baronet (1835–1912)
Sir William Edgar Waller, 7th Baronet (1863–1943)
Sir Roland Edgar Waller, 8th Baronet (1892–1958)
Sir Robert William Waller, 9th Baronet (1934–2000)
Sir John Michael Waller, 10th Baronet (born 1962)

The heir apparent is the present holder's son John Michael Waller (born 1994).

Waller baronets, of Braywick Lodge (1815)
Sir (Jonathan) Wathen Waller, 1st Baronet (1769–1853)
Sir Thomas Wathen Waller, 2nd Baronet (1805–1892)
Sir George Henry Waller, 3rd Baronet (1837–1892)
Sir Francis Ernest Waller, 4th Baronet (1880–1914)
Sir Wathen Arthur Waller, 5th Baronet (1881–1947)
Sir Edmund Waller, 6th Baronet (1871–1954), (note: Edmund Waller (disambiguation));
Sir John Stanier Waller, 7th Baronet (1917–1995)

References

Sources 
Kidd, Charles, Williamson, David (editors). Debrett's Peerage and Baronetage (1990 edition). New York: St Martin's Press, 1990, 

Baronetcies in the Baronetage of Ireland
Extinct baronetcies in the Baronetage of the United Kingdom
1780 establishments in Ireland
1815 establishments in the United Kingdom